Co-marketing are Commensal(symbiotic) marketing, Co-creative marketing and collaborate marketing.   

Commensal (symbiotic) marketingCommensal (symbiotic) marketing is a marketing on which both corporation and a corporation, a corporation and a consumer, country and a country, human and nature can live. The ７Cs Compass ModelShimizu, Koichi (2019) "Advertising Theory and Strategies,"(Japanese) 19th edition, Souseisha Book Company in Tokyo.() pp. 63-102.Shimizu, Koichi (2022)"7Cs Compass Model of Co-marketing in the Sustainable era,"(Japanese), Souseisha Book Company in Tokyo. by Koichi Shimizu is a framework of Co-marketing (Commensal marketing or Symbiotic marketing).The four elements of the ７Cs Compass Model 
A formal approach to this customer-focused marketing mix is known as Four Cs (Commodity, Cost, Channel, Communication) in “７Cs Compass Model. The four Cs Model provides a demand/customer centric version alternative to the well-known four Ps supply side model (product, price, place, promotion) of marketing management:
Product   → Commodity
Price	→ Cost
Place	→ Channel
Promotion → Communication
 (C2)Commodity – (Original meaning of Latin: Commodus=convenient) : the product for the consumers or citizens. Not product out.
 (C3)Cost – (Original meaning of Latin: Constare= It makes sacrifices) : producing cost, selling cost, purchasing cost and social cost.
 (C4)Channel – (Original meaning is a Canal) : Flow of commodity : marketing channels.
 (C5)Communication – (Original meaning of Latin:Communio=sharing of meaning) : marketing communication : It doesn't promote the sales.(C7)Circumstances – (Needle of compass to Circumstances )
In addition to the consumer, there are various uncontrollable external environmental factors encircling the companies. Here it can also be explained by the first character of the four directions marked on the compass model:
N = National and International(Political, legal and ethical)environment 
W = Weather
S = Social and Cultural
E = Economic

 Co-creative marketing 
The co-creation of a company and consumers are contained in the co-marketing. Co-creation''' is a management initiative, or form of economic strategy, that brings different parties together (for instance, a company and a group of customers), in order to jointly produce a mutually valued outcome.

Collaborate marketing 
Collaborate marketing is a marketing practice where two companies cooperate with separate distribution channels, sometimes including profit sharing. It is frequently confused with co-promotion.

See also
Advertising
Co-creation
Marketing
Marketing mix

References

External links
 
 

Business-to-business
Marketing strategy